Mathilde Roth Schechter (also Matilda; December 16, 1859 – August 27, 1924) was the American founder of the U.S. National Women's League of Conservative Judaism in 1918.

Biography
Schechter was born in Breslau, Prussia (now Wrocław, Poland). She was married to Dr. Solomon Schechter, a prominent rabbi who was chancellor of the Jewish Theological Seminary of America (JTSA). They lived in Cambridge, England before immigrating to the United States in 1902.

She founded and taught at the Columbia Religious and Industrial School for Jewish Girls. After assisting Henrietta Szold in creating Hadassah, Schechter later served as its national chairwoman of education. The Mathilde Schechter Residence Hall formerly contained undergraduate housing for students of the JTSA's List College.

She died at Mount Sinai Hospital in Manhattan on August 27, 1924, following an operation.

References

External links

American Conservative Jews
1859 births
1924 deaths
Educators from New York City
American women educators
People from Wrocław
Prussian emigrants to the United States